is the 23rd single by Japanese singer Yōko Oginome. Written by Reo Mikami and Tadashi Ishikawa, the single was released on December 16, 1991, by Victor Entertainment.

Background and release
The song was used by Xebio Holdings for their Victoria sporting goods store commercial featuring Oginome.

"Nee" peaked at No. 14 on Oricon's singles chart and sold over 206,000 copies, marking a career resurgence for Oginome.

Oginome re-recorded the song in her 2014 cover album Dear Pop Singer.

Track listing
All music is arranged by Yukio Sugai, Kōichi Kaminaga, and Ryujin Inoue.

Charts
Weekly charts

Year-end charts

References

External links

1991 singles
Yōko Oginome songs
Japanese-language songs
Victor Entertainment singles

ja:ねえ (荻野目洋子の曲)